Cormac Mhac Taidhg Bhallaigh Ó Dálaigh, Irish poet, fl. 1200–1600.

Overview

A member of the Ó Dálaigh family of professional poets, Cormac's floruit is uncertain, and can only be assigned to the High and Late Medieval Era in Ireland.

His principal surviving poem, Mairg théid tar toil a athar, consists of one hundred and twenty four lines. It survives in 
Trinity College Dublin Library's MS 1340, 26 (alias H. 3. 19). Lambert McKenna published an untranslated version in 1938.

Opening verse

References

 Dioghluim Dána, Láimhbheartach Mac Cionnaith (Lambert McKenna) ed., Dublin, Oifig an tSoláthair [Government Publication Office], (1938) page 121–124.

External links
 http://celt.ucc.ie/published/G402063/index.html

Medieval Irish poets
Year of death unknown
Year of birth unknown
Irish male poets